Jela is a Slavic female given name. Notable people with this name include:

 Jela Cello (born 1987), Serbian cellist
 Jela Krečič (born 1979), Slovenian writer and journalist
 Jela Spiridonović-Savić (1890–1974), Serbian poet
 Jela Špitková (born 1947), Slovak/Austrian violinist